My Awakening: A Path to Racial Understanding is a 1998 autobiography written by David Duke. Duke's social philosophies are outlined, including the reasoning behind his advocacy of racial segregation.

Duke said in 1999 that Louisiana Republican governor Mike Foster's money had essentially financed My Awakening after Duke told a grand jury that during the 1995 Louisiana governor's race Foster had secretly bought Duke's list of contributors and supporters.

Glayde Whitney, a Florida State University psychology professor, wrote the foreword to the book, calling Duke a "seeker of truth."

Reception
In a book review by Abraham Foxman, then National Director of the  Anti-Defamation League (ADL), My Awakening was described as "a Minor League Mein Kampf", and Foxman commented that it espouses racist, antisemitic, sexist, and homophobic attitudes.

References

External links
My Awakening at Google Books

1998 non-fiction books
Autobiographies
Political autobiographies
Books about race and ethnicity
Books about the United States
Books by David Duke
English-language books
American autobiographies
Books about the Ku Klux Klan
Works about White Americans
Works about white nationalism